Promised Land is an unincorporated community and census-designated place (CDP) in Greenwood County, South Carolina, United States. The population was 511 at the 2010 census.

Geography
Promised Land is located in western Greenwood County at  (34.1315, -82.2382). South Carolina Highway 10 passes through the community, leading northeast  to Greenwood, the county seat, and south 6 miles to Bradley.

Demographics

As of the census of 2000, there were 559 people, 184 households, and 142 families residing in the CDP. The population density was 354.7 people per square mile (136.6/km2). There were 197 housing units at an average density of 125.0/sq mi (48.1/km2). The racial makeup of the CDP was 2.86% White, 95.89% African American, 0.89% Asian, and 0.36% from two or more races. Hispanic or Latino of any race were 1.07% of the population.

There were 184 households, out of which 31.5% had children under the age of 18 living with them, 51.1% were married couples living together, 22.8% had a female householder with no husband present, and 22.3% were non-families. 20.1% of all households were made up of individuals, and 8.7% had someone living alone who was 65 years of age or older. The average household size was 3.04 and the average family size was 3.55.

In the CDP, the population was spread out, with 27.4% under the age of 18, 10.0% from 18 to 24, 25.8% from 25 to 44, 25.2% from 45 to 64, and 11.6% who were 65 years of age or older. The median age was 36 years. For every 100 females, there were 82.7 males. For every 100 females age 18 and over, there were 77.3 males.

The median income for a household in the CDP was $40,288, and the median income for a family was $42,212. Males had a median income of $22,431 versus $25,000 for females. The per capita income for the CDP was $11,630. About 16.5% of families and 18.4% of the population were below the poverty line, including 4.8% of those under age 18 and 35.0% of those age 65 or over.

References

Census-designated places in Greenwood County, South Carolina
Census-designated places in South Carolina
Populated places in South Carolina established by African Americans